Alikadam is an upazila of Bandarban District in the Division of Chittagong, Bangladesh.

Geography
It has 4,923 households and a total area of 885.78 km2.

At the boundary with Thanchi Upazila, the  Alikadam-Thanchi Road ascends hill Dim Pahar, making it one of the highest motorable roads in Bangladesh.

Demographics
According to the 1991 Bangladesh census, Ali Kadam had a population of 24,782. Males constituted 55.21% of the population, and females 44.79%. The population aged 18 or over was 13,312. Ali Kadam had an average literacy rate of 20.7% (7+ years), compared to the national average of 32.4%.

Religion
The religions of Ali Kadam are Muslim 85.32%, Buddhist 13.68%, Hindu 0.77%, with 0.23% following other religions. The religious institutions consist of 680 mosques, 65 pagodas, 55 Buddhist temples and 8 Hindu temples.

Points of interest

Alikadam is a popular hiking destination among tourists for the tunnels in the mountains known as "Alir Guha" or "Ali's Tunnels". Tourists are expected to face slippery and muddy terrains for the hike to the tunnels. Winter is the safest season to travel because the mountain streams and rivers are dangerous during Monsoon.

Another popular point is Marayan Thong. Recently it became popular tourist spot. Marayong Dong (Marayon Thong) is a hill in the Mirinja Range of Alikadam Police Station in Bandarban District. This hill is also known as Marayan Tong, Maraing Tong, Merai Thong Jadi, Maraing Dong etc. There is a Buddhist shrine on the top of this hill which is about 1650 feet high. The huge Buddha statues in the open nature make this place more solemn. The mountains on the horizon and the river Matamuhuri flowing like a snake below, the crop fields are all a state of imagination will give unconditional feelings.
Most of the tribals including Tripura, Marma, Murang people live in this Marayong Thong hill. Indigenous neighborhoods in the foothills have added special diversity to the beauty of the hills of Ali Kadam. The lifestyle of the people who depend on the mountains and the pure nature fills the eyes of the tourists who come here.

Administration
Alikadam Upazila is divided into four union parishads: Alikadam, Chaikkhyang, Kurukpata, and Nayapara.

Education
There is a shortage of high schools. Now there is only a government high school in Ali Kadam.

See also
Upazilas of Bangladesh
Districts of Bangladesh
Divisions of Bangladesh

References

Upazilas of Bandarban District